Dyzma Kazimierz Gałaj (1915, Mystkowice - 2000, Warsaw) was a Polish sociologist and politician.

During World War II he was a member of the Polish peasant Bataliony Chłopskie resistance. After the war he would become a communist political activist, and study at the University of Łódź. He would be a member of the Polish parliament (Sejm) from 1965 to 1985 and marshal of the Sejm in 1971–1972, representing the United People's Party (ZSL). From 1972 to 1976 he was a member of the Polish Council of State. In politics, he was seen as a supporter of general Mieczysław Moczar.

As a scholar, his work concentrated on the 20th century Polish peasants.

References 

1915 births
2000 deaths
People from Łowicz County
People from Warsaw Governorate
United People's Party (Poland) politicians
Marshals of the Sejm
Members of the Polish Sejm 1965–1969
Members of the Polish Sejm 1969–1972
Members of the Polish Sejm 1972–1976
Polish sociologists
Recipients of the Order of the Banner of Work

Academic staff of the University of Warmia and Mazury in Olsztyn